The Blind River is a river in Algoma District in Northeastern Ontario, Canada. The river is in the Great Lakes Basin and is tributary of Lake Huron.

This river was called a "blind river" because the river's mouth is not easily seen from the lake. Its native (Ojibway) name is "biniwaabikong", which means "at the fallen rock" due to the smooth, sloping rock face along the river.

The river flows south from Pathfinder Lake through a group of other large lakes (such as Matinenda, Chiblow, and Duborne) before emptying into the North Channel of Lake Huron at the municipality of Blind River.

A sawmill was built near the mouth of this river in 1837. There is a small hydroelectric plant where the river drains Lake Duborne.

Tributaries
Potomac River (right)

Blind River Provincial Park

The Blind River Provincial Park is a waterway park protecting the river, its banks, and the lakes along its way from its headwaters at Stone Lake to Matinenda Lake. Additionally it includes the streams and lakes that make up the Flack Lake Figure Eight and the Dunlop Lake–Mace Lake Canoe Routes. It was established in 2004 and is meant for canoe camping, boating, fishing, hunting, wildlife/nature watching. Features in the park include wetlands, large islands, a scenic canyon and a falls at the inlet to Matinenda Lake.

The park is regionally significant due to its cold water aquatic environments and its headwater protection function. It abuts the Matinenda Provincial Park to the south.

It is a non-operating park, meaning that there are no services. The only facilities are backcountry campsites.

See also
List of rivers of Ontario

References

Sources

External links

Rivers of Algoma District
Tributaries of Lake Huron